KLJH (107.1 FM) is a radio station broadcasting a Contemporary Inspirational format. Licensed to Bayfield, Colorado, United States, the station serves the Four Corners area. The station is currently owned by Voice Ministries of Farmington and features programming from Salem Communications.

References

External links

Radio stations established in 1983
LJH
1983 establishments in Colorado
La Plata County, Colorado
Contemporary Christian radio stations in the United States